Julie Logue (born 1971) is an Irish former cricketer who played as a right-handed batter and wicket-keeper. She appeared in 19 One Day Internationals for Ireland between 1988 and 1996, including being part of Ireland's squad for the 1988 Women's Cricket World Cup. In 2017, she came out of retirement to play for Scorchers in the Toyota Super 3s.

References

External links
 
 

1971 births
Living people
Irish women cricketers
Ireland women One Day International cricketers
Place of birth missing (living people)
Scorchers (women's cricket) cricketers